Agenda setting describes the "ability (of the news media) to influence the importance placed on the topics of the public agenda". The theory suggests that the media has the ability to shape public opinion by determining what issues are given the most attention, and has been widely studied and applied to various forms of media. The study of agenda-setting describes the way media attempts to influence viewers, and establish a hierarchy of news prevalence. Nations judged to be endowed with more political power receive higher media exposure. The agenda-setting by media is driven by the media's bias on things such as politics, economy and culture, etc. The evolution of agenda-setting and laissez-faire components of communication research encouraged a fast pace growth and expansion of these perspectives. Agenda-setting has phases that need to be in a specific order in order for it to succeed.

The theory was first introduced by Walter Lippmann in the 1920s and further developed by Bernard Cohen in the 1960s. The theory was formally developed by Maxwell McCombs and Donald Shaw in a study on the 1968 presidential election, which found a correlation between the issues covered by the media and the issues perceived as important by the public.

History 

Agenda-setting theory was formally developed by Dr. Maxwell McCombs and Dr. Donald Lewis Shaw in a study on the 1968 presidential election deemed "the Chapel Hill study". McCombs and Shaw demonstrated a strong correlation between one hundred Chapel Hill residents' thought on what was the most important election issue and what the local news media reported was the most important issue. By comparing the salience of issues in news content with the public's perceptions, McCombs and Shaw determines the degree to which the media sways public. The theory also suggests that media has a great influence to their audience by instilling what they should think about, instead of what they actually think. That is, if a news item is covered frequently and prominently, the audience will regard the issue as more important.

Early research 
The history of study of agenda-setting can be traced to the first chapter of Walter Lippmann's 1922 book, Public Opinion. In that chapter, "The World Outside And The Pictures In Our Heads", Lippmann argues that the mass media are the principal connection between events in the world and the images in the minds of the public. Without using the term "agenda-setting", Walter Lippmann was writing about what we today would call "agenda-setting". According to Lippmann, the public responds not to actual events in the environment but to “the pictures in our heads,” which he calls the pseudo-environment: “For the real environment is altogether too big, too complex, and too fleeing for direct acquaintance. We are not equipped to deal with so much subtlety, so much variety, so many permutations and combinations. And although we have to act in that environment, we have to reconstruct it on a simpler model before we can manage with it.” The media step in and essentially set the agenda, offering simpler models by which people can make sense of the world.

Following Lippmann's 1922 book, Bernard Cohen observed (in 1963) that the press "may not be successful much of the time in telling people what to think, but it is stunningly successful in telling its readers what to think about. The world will look different to different people," Cohen continues, "depending on the map that is drawn for them by writers, editors, and publishers of the paper they read." As early as the 1960s, Cohen had expressed the idea that later led to formalization of agenda-setting theory by McCombs and Shaw. The stories with the strongest agenda setting influence tend to be those that involve conflict, terrorism, crime and drug issues within the United States. Those that don't include or involve the United States and politics associate negatively with public opinion. In turn, there is less concern.

Although Maxwell McCombs already had some interest in the field, he was exposed to Cohen's work while serving as a faculty member at UCLA, and it was Cohen's work that heavily influenced him, and later Donald Shaw. The concept of agenda setting was launched by McCombs and Shaw during the 1968 presidential election in Chapel Hill, North Carolina. They examined Lippmann's idea of construction of the pictures in our heads by comparing the issues on the media agenda with key issues on the undecided voters' agenda. They found evidence of agenda setting by identifying that salience of the news agenda is highly correlated to that of the voters' agenda. McCombs and Shaw were the first to provide the field of communication with empirical evidence that demonstrated the power of mass media and its influence on the public agenda. The empirical evidence also earned this theory its credibility amongst other social scientific theories.

A relatively unknown scholar named G. Ray Funkhouser performed a study highly similar to McCombs and Shaw's around the same time the authors were formalizing the theory. All three scholars – McCombs, Shaw, and Funkhouser – even presented their findings at the same academic conference. Funkhouser's article was published later than McCombs and Shaw's, and Funkhouser doesn't receive as much credit as McCombs and Shaw for discovering agenda setting. According to Everett Rogers, there are two main reasons for this. First, Funkhouser didn't formally name the theory. Second, Funkhouser didn't pursue his research much past the initial article. Rogers also suggests that Funkhouser was geographically isolated at Stanford, cut off from interested researchers, whereas McCombs and Shaw had got other people interested in agenda setting research.

Development of "Agenda-setting theory" 
In the 1968 "Chapel Hill study", McCombs and Shaw demonstrated a strong correlation coefficient (r > .9) between what 100 residents of Chapel Hill, North Carolina thought was the most important election issue and what the local and national news media reported was the most important issue. By comparing the salience of issues in news content with the public's perceptions of the most important election issue, McCombs and Shaw were able to determine the degree to which the media determines public opinion. Since the 1968 study, published in a 1972 edition of Public Opinion Quarterly, more than 400 studies have been published on the agenda-setting function of the mass media, and the theory continues to be regarded as relevant.

Three models of agenda-setting 

There are following 3 models of analyzing "the effect of agenda-setting":
 "Awareness model" 
 "Priorities model" 
 "Salience model"

The research on the effect of agenda-setting compares the salience of issues in news content with the public perceptions of the most important issue, and then analyses the extent of influence by guidance of the media. There are three models by Max McCombs: the "awareness model", the "priorities model" and the "salience model". Most investigations are centered on these three models.

Different media have different agenda-setting potential. From the perspective of agenda-setting, the analysis of the relationship between traditional media and new virtual spaces has witnessed growing momentum. One of the most critical aspects in the concept of an agenda-setting role of mass communication is the time frame for this phenomenon.

Most researches on agenda-setting are based on the following: 
 the press and the media do not reflect reality; they filter and shape it;
 media concentration on a few issues and subjects leads the public to perceive those issues as more important than other issues.

Three types of agenda-setting: Policy-makers, media and audience 

Research shows that the media agenda, audience agenda and policy agenda influence the agenda setting as described in the following section. Rogers and Dearing describe how following types of agenda setting (dependent variable in research) are influenced by other factors:
 "Policy agenda-setting" or "Political agenda setting"
 "Media agenda-setting" or "Agenda building"
 "Public/Audience agenda-setting"
Studies have shown that what the media decides to expose correlates with their views on things such as politics, economy and culture. Aside from bias, other critics of the news media claim that news in the United States has become a form of entertainment. Instead of providing the public with the information they need, journalists instead strive to fill the publics' appetite for shocking and sensational headlines. Countries that tend to have more political power are more likely to receive media exposure. Financial resources, technologies, foreign trade and money spent on the military can be some of the main factors that explain coverage inequality.

Mass communication research, Rogers and Dearing argue, has focused a great deal on "public agenda setting" (e.g. McCombs and Shaw, 1972) and "media agenda setting", but has largely ignored "policy agenda setting", which is studied primarily by political scientists. As such, the authors suggest mass communication scholars pay more attention to how the media and public agendas might influence elite policy maker's agendas (i.e. scholars should ask where the President or members of the U.S. Congress get their news from and how this affects their policies). Writing in 2006, Walgrave and Van Aelst took up Rogers and Dearing's suggestions, creating a preliminary theory of political agenda setting, which examines factors that might influence elite policy makers' agendas.

Process of agenda-setting (known as accessibility) 

Agenda setting occurs through a cognitive process known as "accessibility". Accessibility implies that the more frequently and prominently the news media cover an issue, the more instances of that issue become accessible in audience's memories. When respondents are asked what the most important problem facing the country is, they answer with the most accessible news issue in memory, which is typically the issue the news media focused on the most. The agenda-setting effect is not the result of receiving one or a few messages but is due to the aggregate impact of a very large number of messages, each of which has a different content but all of which deal with the same general issue. 
Mass-media coverage in general and agenda-setting in particular also has a powerful impact on what individuals think that other people are thinking, and hence they tend to allocate more importance to issues that have been extensively covered by mass media. This is also called schemata theory. In psychology and cognitive science, a schema (plural schemata or schemas) describes a pattern of thought or behavior that organizes categories of information and the relationships among them.

Comparison of agenda-setting with policy agenda-building
As more scholars published articles on agenda-setting theories it became evident that the process involves not only active role of media organizations, but also participation of the public as well as policymakers. Rogers and Dearing described the difference between agenda-setting and agenda-building based on the dominant role of media or public. Thus "setting" an agenda refers to the effect of the media agenda on society, transfer of the media agenda to the public agenda, while "building" an agenda includes "some degree of reciprocity" between the mass media and society where both media and public agendas influence public policy.

According to Sun Young Lee and Daniel Riffe, the agenda-building theory speculates that the media does not operate within a vacuum. The media agenda in fact is the result of the influences that certain powerful groups exert as a subtle form of social control. Journalists have limited time and limited resources that can contribute to external sources getting involved in the news media's gatekeeping process, and some scholars have attempted to reveal certain relationships between information sources and the agenda the news media has made up, probing who builds the media agenda. There are multiple sources that can participate in this agenda-building process through various different ways, but researchers have been the most interested in the effectiveness of information aids such as media kits and press releases within the news media agenda, and this is a measure of the success of organizations public relations efforts.

Berkowitz has implemented a more nuanced analysis of agenda-setting and agenda-building theories by introducing the terms policy agenda-setting and policy agenda-building. He argues that when scholars investigate only the linkage between media and policymakers, it is still appropriate to use the notion of policy agenda-setting. However, when the focus is placed not only on policymakers' personal agendas, but also on the broader salient issues where media represent only one indicator of public sentiment, Berkowitz suggests talking about policy agenda-building.

Agenda-building 

The agenda-building perspective ascribes importance not only to mass media and policymakers, but also to social process, to mutually interdependent relation between the concerns generated in social environment and the vitality of governmental process. Thus according to Cobb and Elder, the agenda-building framework makes allowances for continuing mass involvement and broaden the range of recognized influences on the public policy-making process. Although the public does have a place on the list of possibly influencing the media agenda, they are not thought to powerfully shape media agendas. It seems the more correct to argue the possibility that when journalists look to their own interests for story ideas, they are actually trying to predict their audience's needs.

This idea of mass involvement has become more prominent with the advent of the Internet and its potential to make everyone a pamphleteer. Increase in the role of citizens in agenda setting sheds light on a new direction in the traditional agenda-building research. This is now the case because the general public can now create their own media. Social media has changed the way people view and perceive things in today's world. Mass involvement within social media lets the general publics voices be heard. Comments and reply's give potential for people to address your thoughts or open new doors for conversation.

Kim and Lee noted that the agenda-setting research on the Internet differs from traditional agenda-setting research with respect that the Internet is in competition with traditional media and has enormous capacity for contents' and users' interactivity. Lee, Lancendorfer and Lee argued that "various opinions about public issues are posted on the Internet bulletin boards or the Usenet newsgroup by Netizens, and the opinions then form an agenda in which other Netizens can perceive the salient issue". Scholars also stated that the Internet plays role in forming Internet user's opinion as well as the public space.

Kim and Lee studied the pattern of the Internet mediated agenda-setting by conducting a case study of 10 cases that have a great ripple effect in Korea for 5 years (from 2000 until 2005). Scholars found that a person's opinion could be disseminated through various online channels and could synthesize public opinion that influences news coverage. Their study suggests 'reversed agenda effects', meaning that public agenda could set media agenda. Maxwell McCombs also mentioned "reverse agenda-setting" in his recent textbook as a situation where public concern sets the media agenda.

According to Kim and Lee, agenda-building through the Internet take the following three steps: 1) Internet-mediated agenda-rippling: an anonymous netizen's opinion spreads to the important agenda in the Internet through online main rippling channels such as blogs, personal homepages, and the Internet bulletin boards. 2) agenda diffusion in the Internet: online news or web-sites report the important agenda in the Internet that in turn leads to spreading the agenda to more online publics. 3) Internet-mediated reversed agenda-setting: traditional media report online agenda to the public so that the agenda spread to both offline and online publics. However, scholars concluded that the Internet-mediated agenda-setting or agenda-building processes not always occur in consecutive order. For example, the agenda that was reported by traditional media can come to the fore again through the online discussion or the three steps can occur simultaneously in a short period of time.

Several studies provide evidence that the Internet-community, particularly bloggers, can push their own agenda into public agenda, then media agenda, and, eventually, into policy agenda. In the most comprehensive study to date, Wallsten tracked mainstream media coverage and blog discussion of 35 issues during the 2004 presidential campaign. Using time-series analysis, Wallsten found evidence that journalists discuss the issues that bloggers are blogging about. There are also anecdotal pieces of evidence suggesting bloggers exert an influence on the political agenda. For instance, in 2005 Eason Jordan, the chief news executive at CNN, abruptly resigned after being besieged by the online community after saying, according to various witnesses, that he believed the United States military had aimed at journalists in Iraq and killed 12 of them. Similarly, in 2002, Trent Lott had to resign as Senate majority leader due to his inappropriate racist remarks that were widely discussed in the blogosphere. However bloggers attract attention not only to oust journalists and politicians. An online investigation on technical problems with electronic voting machines started by an activist Bev Harris in 2003 eventually forced traditional media outlets to address issue of electronic voting malperformance. This in turn made Diebold, a company that produces these machines, to acknowledge its fault and take measures to fix it. Many studies have been performed to test the agenda setting theory within global news coverage. One of the findings determined that foreign news that had any mentions of the United States or the UK, greatly influenced public opinion compared to global news that didn't involve either country.

Agenda-setting 

Some groups have a greater ease of access than others and are thus more likely to get their demands placed on agenda than others. For instance, policymakers have been found to be more influential than the overall group of news sources because they often better understand journalists' needs for reliable and predictable information and their definition of newsworthiness. Cobb and Elder ascribed even more importance to decision makers, claiming that in order for an issue to attain agenda status, it must be supported by at least some of key decision makers as they act as guardians of the formal agenda. They also asserted that certain personages in the media can act as opinion leaders and bring media coverage to a particular issue. Government-affiliated news sources have higher success rates in becoming media agenda and have been found by a number of scholars to be the most frequently appearing of sources at the local, state, and national levels.

News sources can also provide definitions of issues, thus determining the terms of future discussion and framing problems in particular ways. As McCombs and Valenzuela stated; "We don't need the media to alert us about inflation as routine purchases reveal its presence. But to learn about abstract economic topics such as budget deficits, our main- if not only- source is the news media." What interpretation of "reality" will dominate public discourse has implications for the future of the social problem, for the interest groups and policymakers involved, and for the policy itself. For example, Gusfield argues that the highway deaths associated with alcohol consumption can be interpreted as a problem of irresponsible drunken drivers, insufficient automobile crashworthiness, a transportation system overly dependent on cars, poor highway design, excessive emphasis on drinking in adult social life. Different ways of framing the situation may compete to be accepted as an authoritative version of reality, consequently spurring competition between sources of information for definition of an issue. Very powerful resources of information can even influence whether an issue receives media attention at all.

The relationship of media and policymakers is symbiotic and is controlled by shared culture of unofficial set of ground rules as journalists need access to official information and policymakers need media coverage; nevertheless the needs of journalists and policymakers are often incompatible because of their different orientation in time as powerful sources are at their best in routine situations and react more slowly when crisis or disaster occur. Consequently, policymakers who understand the rules of this culture the best will be most capable of setting their agendas and issue definitions. On the other hand, media also influence policymakers when government officials and politicians take the amount of media attention given to an issue as an indirect expression of public interest in the issue.

Academic research on agenda-setting theory

Review studies on agenda-setting theory 
Various critiques have been made of agenda-setting theory:
Agenda-setting is an inherently causal theory, but few studies establish the hypothesized temporal order (the media should set the public's agenda).
The measurement of the dependent variable was originally conceptualized as the public's perceived issue "salience", but subsequent studies have conceptualized the dependent variable as awareness, attention, or concern, leading to differing outcomes.
Studies tend to aggregate media content categories and public responses into very broad categories, resulting in inflated correlation coefficients.
The theory seemed to imply that the audience takes generally passive position. However, the public is not as passive as the theory assumed. Theorist John Fiske has challenged the view of a passive audience.

Additional factors to be considered in agenda-setting research

"Impact of media on audience" and "quantum of impact on individuals in audience" 
In an attempt to overcome mirror-image effects of agenda-setting that implied direct influence of media agenda on the audience, several scholars proposed that the model of agenda-setting should include individual/collective audience characteristics or real-world conditions that are likely to affect issue importance. They discovered that certain individual and group characteristics are likely to act as contingent conditions of media impact and proposed a model of "audience effects".

According to the audience-effects model, media coverage interacts with the audience's pre-existing sensitivities to produce changes in issue concerns. Thus, media effects are contingent on issue-specific audience characteristics. For instance, for high-sensitivity audiences who are most affected by a certain issue or a problem, the salience of this issue increases substantially with news exposure, while the same exposure has little effect on other groups. Erbring, Goldenberg and Miller have also demonstrated that people who do not talk about political issues are more subject to agenda-setting influence because they depend more heavily on media content than those who receive information from other sources, including their colleagues and friends.

Another factor that causes variations in the correlation between the media and public agenda is whether an issue is "obtrusive" or "unobtrusive"; i.e., whether it has a high or low issue threshold. Obtrusive or issues with low threshold are generally the ones that affect nearly everyone and with which we can have some kind of personal experience (e.g. citywide crime or increases in gasoline prices). Because of their link to personal concerns, these issues almost compel attention from political elites as well as the news media. Moreover, with this type of issues the problem would be of general concern even without attention from the news media.

Unobtrusive or high threshold issues are those issues that are generally remote from just about everyone (e.g., high-level wrongdoing, such as the Watergate scandal; plight of Syrian refugees). Research performed by Zucker suggests that an issue is obtrusive if most members of the public have had direct contact with it, and less obtrusive if audience members have not had direct experience. This means that the less direct experience people have with an issue, the greater is the news media's influence on public opinion on that issue.

Moreover, unobtrusive or high-threshold issues do not pertain into media agenda as quickly as obtrusive issues and therefore require a buildup, which is a function of more than the amount of space or time the media devote to the story. The latter may push the story past the threshold of inattention, but it is also important to look at the kind of coverage to explain how a certain incident becomes an issue.

Impact of "personal relevance to individuals" on "individual need for orientation" 
Agenda-setting studies typically show variability in the correlation between media and public agenda. To explain differences in the correlation, McCombs and colleagues created the concept of "need for orientation", which "describes individual differences in the desire for orienting cues and background information".

Two concepts: relevance and uncertainty, define an individual's need for orientation. Relevance suggests that an individual will not seek news media information if an issue is not personally relevant. Hence, if relevance is low, people will feel the need for less orientation. There are many issues in our country that are just not relevant to people, because they do not affect us. Many news organizations attempt to frame issues in a way that attempts to make them relevant to its audiences. This is their way of keeping their viewership/readership high. "Level of uncertainty is the second defining condition of need for orientation. Frequently, individuals already have all the information that they desire about a topic. Their degree of uncertainty is low." When issues are of high personal relevance and uncertainty low, the need to monitor any changes in those issues will be present and there will be a moderate the need for orientation. If at any point in time viewers/readers have high relevance and high uncertainty about any type of issue/event/election campaign there was a high need for orientation.

David Weaver (1977) adapted the concept of "individual's need for orientation" defined regarding relevance and uncertainty. Research done by Weaver in 1977 suggested that individuals vary on their need for orientation. Need for orientation is a combination of the individual's interest in the topic and uncertainty about the issue. The higher levels of interest and uncertainty produce higher levels of need for orientation. So the individual would be considerably likely to be influenced by the media stories (psychological aspect of theory).

Schonbach and Weaver (1985) focused on need for orientation showed the strongest agenda-setting effects at a moderate need for orientation (under conditions of low interest and high uncertainty).

Theory development in agenda-setting research

Second-level agenda-setting: attribute agenda setting 
"After first-level agenda-setting effects were established, researchers began to explore a "second-level" of agenda setting that examines the influence of attribute salience, or the properties, qualities, and characteristics that describe objects or people in the news and the tone of those attributes." The second level of agenda setting was suggested after research confirmed the effects of the theory. 
As agenda-setting theory was being developed, scholars pointed out many attributes that describe the object. Each of the objects on an agenda has a lot of attributes containing cognitive components such as information that describes characteristics of the object, and an affective component including tones (positive, negative, neutral) of the characteristics on agenda. The agenda setting theory and the second level of agenda setting, framing, are both relevant and similar in demonstrating how society is influenced by media, but they describe a different process of influence. One tells us what information to process and the other tells us how to process that information. Framing theory, an extension of agenda setting, describes how the "stance" an article of media may take can affect the perception of the viewer. It is said that there are two main attributes of the second-level of agenda setting. Those include substantive and affective. The substantive factor has to do mainly with things such as personality and ideology. The affective factor is focused on the positive, negative, and neutral side of things. For example, media coverage of a political candidate's experience would be included in the substantive dimension of second-level agenda-setting, whereas the attitude toward the candidate's experience (positive, negative, or neutral) would be included in the affective dimension.

Hierarchy of effects theory
Coleman and Wu (2009) emphasized the similarities between the hierarchy of effects theory and agenda-setting theory, and how the latter can be used to analyze the former. The hierarchy of effects theory has three components: knowledge, attitude, and behavior, also known as "learn, feel, do." The first level of agenda-setting, such as a policy issue gaining public attention, corresponds to the "knowledge" component of the hierarchy of effects theory. The second level of agenda-setting, such as how the public views or feels about a policy issue, corresponds to the "attitude" component. Coleman and Wu's study is not so much focused on the order of these components, but instead on which component, knowledge (level one) and attitude (level two), has a greater effect on public behavior.

Second-level agenda-setting vs. framing 
McCombs et al. (1997) demonstrated that agenda-setting research at the second level deals with the influence of 'attribute' salience, whereas the first level agenda-setting illustrates the influence of 'issue' salience. Balmas and Sheafer (2010) argued that the focus at the first level agenda-setting which emphasizes media's role in telling us "what to think about" is shifted to media's function of telling us "how to think about" at the second level agenda-setting. The second level of agenda-setting considers how the agenda of attributes affects public opinion (McCombs & Evatt, 1995). Furthermore, Ghanem(1997) demonstrated that the certain attributes agendas in the news with low psychological distance, drove compelling arguments for the salience of public agenda. The second-level agenda-setting differs from traditional agenda-setting in that it focus on attribute salience, and public's attribute agenda is regarded as one of the important variables.

One example that helps illustrate the effects of framing involves president Nixon's involvement in the watergate scandal. According to a study conducted by Lang and Lang, the media coverage at first belittled the watergate scandal and the President's involvement. It wasn't until the story was framed as one of the highest political scandals in US history that the public opinion changed (Lang & Lang, 1981) This event depicts how the media personnel have a great deal of power in persuading the public's opinions. It also suggests that framing is a form of gatekeeping, similar to the agenda setting theory.

There is a debate over whether framing theory should be subsumed within agenda-setting as "second-level agenda-setting". McCombs, Shaw, Weaver and colleagues generally argue that framing is a part of agenda-setting that operates as a "second-level" or secondary effect. Dietram Scheufele has argued the opposite. Scheufele argues that framing and agenda-setting possess distinct theoretical boundaries, operate via distinct cognitive processes (accessibility vs. attribution), and relate to different outcomes (perceptions of issue importance vs. interpretation of news issue).

When talking about the second-level of agenda setting, as well as the political aspects of the theory, its pivotal to include priming. Priming is considered to be the step past agenda setting, and is also referred to as the last step of the process. Priming is primarily used in political settings. It discusses how the media will choose to leave some issues about the candidates out of coverage, while presenting other issues in the fore front. This process creates different standards by which the public evaluates candidates. As well, by reporting the issues that have the most salience on the public; they are not objectively presenting both candidates equally. 
 
According to Weaver, framing and second-level agenda setting have the following characteristics:

Similarities:

 Both are more concerned with how issues or other objects are depicted in the media than with which issues or objects are more or less prominently reported.
 Both focus on most salient or prominent aspects of themes or descriptions of the objects of interest.
 Both are concerned with ways of thinking rather than objects of thinking

Differences:

 Framing does seem to include a broader range of cognitive processes – moral evaluations, causal reasoning, appeals to principle, and recommendations for treatment of problems – than does second-level agenda-setting (the salience of attributes of an object).  Scheufele and Tewksbury argue that "framing differs significantly from these accessibility-based models [i.e., agenda setting and priming]. It is based on the assumption that how an issue is characterized in news reports can have an influence on how it is understood by audiences;" the difference between whether we think about an issue and how we think about it. Framing and agenda setting differ in their functions in the process of news production, information processing and media effects.
 News production: Although "both frame building and agenda building refer to macroscopic mechanisms that deal with message construction rather than media effects", frame building is more concerned with the news production process than agenda building. In other words, "how forces and groups in society try to shape public discourse about an issue by establishing predominant labels is of far greater interest from a framing perspective than from a traditional agenda-setting one."
 News processing: For framing and agenda-setting, different conditions seem to be needed in processing messages to produce respective effects. Framing effect is more concerned with audience attention to news messages, while agenda setting is more concerned with repeated exposure to messages.
 Locus of effect: Agenda-setting effects are determined by the ease with which people can retrieve from their memory issues recently covered by mass media, while framing is the extent to which media messages fit ideas or knowledge people have in their knowledge store.

Based on these shared characteristics, McCombs and colleagues recently argued that framing effects should be seen as the extension of agenda setting. In other words, according to them, the premise that framing is about selecting "a restricted number of thematically related attributes" for media representation can be understood as the process of transferring the salience of issue attributes (i.e., second-level agenda setting). That is, according to McCombs and colleagues' arguments, framing falls under the umbrella of agenda setting.

Accessibility (agenda-setting) vs. applicability (framing)
According to Price and Tewksbury, however, agenda-setting and framing are built on different theoretical premises: agenda-setting is based on accessibility, while framing is concerned with applicability (i.e., the relevance between message features and one's stored ideas or knowledge). Accessibility-based explanation of agenda-setting is also applied to second-level agenda-setting. That is, transferring the salience of issue attributes (i.e., second-level agenda-setting) is a function of accessibility.

For framing effects, empirical evidence shows that the impact of frames on public perceptions is mainly determined by perceived importance of specific frames rather than by the quickness of retrieving frames. That is, the way framing effects transpires is different from the way second-level agenda-setting is supposed to take place (i.e., accessibility). On a related note, Scheufele and Tewksbury argues that, because accessibility and applicability vary in their functions of media effects, "the distinction between accessibility and applicability effects has obvious benefits for understanding and predicting the effects of dynamic information environments".

Taken together, it can be concluded that the integration of framing into agenda-setting is either impossible because they are based on different theoretical premises or imprudent because merging the two concepts would result in the loss of our capabilities to explain various media effects.

(a)  Accessibility (Agenda-setting)

Increasing attention has been devoted to examining how agenda-setting occur in terms of their psychological mechanisms (Holbrook & Hill, 2005). Price and Tewksbury (1997) argued that agenda-setting effects are based on the accessibility model of information processing. Accessibility can be defined as "how much" or "how recently" a person has been exposed to certain issues (Kim et al., 2002). Specifically, individuals try to make less cognitive effort in forming social judgments, they are more likely to rely on the information that is easily accessible (Higgins, 1996). This leads to a greater probability that more accessible information will be used when people make judgments on certain issues (Iyeanger & Kinder, 1987; Scheufele & Tewksbury, 2007).

The concept of accessibility is the foundation of a memory-based model (Scheufele, 2000). It assumes that individuals make judgments on the issues based on information that is easily available and retrievable from their memory (Tulving & Watkins, 1975; Hastie & Park, 1986; Iyengar, 1990). Tversky and Kahneman (1974) also argue that the formation of individuals' judgments directly correlates with "the ease in which instances or associations could be brought to mind" (p. 208). When individuals receive and process information, they develop memory traces that can be easily recalled to make decisions on a certain issue. Agenda-setting, in this regard, can make certain issue to be easily accessed in individual's memory when forming judgment about the issue.

(b) Applicability (Framing)

The idea of framing theory is closely related to the agenda-setting theory tradition but it expands more upon the research by focusing on the substance of certain issues at hand rather than on a particular topic. This means that the framing theory's basis is that of the media focuses its attention on certain events and then places them within a field of meaning. is the process of selecting certain aspects of an issue to bring people's attention and to lead them a particular line of interpretation (Entman, 1993; Scheufele, 1999). Also, the media's selective uses of certain frames can affect the way the audience thinks about the issue (Oh & Kim, 2010). This may sound similar to attribute agenda-setting. Both seem to examine which attributes or aspects of an issue are emphasized in the media (Kim et al., 2011). Some scholars even argue that framing should be considered as an extension of agenda-setting (McCombs, 1997).

However, framing is based on the applicability model, which is conceptually different from the accessibility model used in agenda-setting. According to Goffman (1974), individuals actively classify and interpret their life experiences to make sense of the world around them. These classifications and interpretations then become the individual's pre-existing and long-standing schema. Framing influences how audience thinks about issues, not by making certain aspects more salient than others, but by invoking interpretive cues that correspond to the individuals' pre-existing schema (Scheufele, 2000). Also, framing is when these interpretive cues correspond with or activate individuals' pre-existing cognitive schema (Kim et al., 2002). Applicability, in this regard, refers to finding the connection between the message in the media and the framework individuals employ to interpret the issue (Scheufele & Tewksbury, 2007).

Kim and his colleagues (2002) provide distinction between the applicability and accessibility models is important in terms of issue salience. Framing assumes that each individual will have its own interpretation of an issue, regardless of the salience of an issue. Specifically, it focuses on the "terminological or semantic differences" of how an issue is described. Agenda-setting, on the other hand, assume that only salient issues in the media will become accessible in people's minds when they evaluate or make judgments on the issue. Taken together, the accessibility of issue salience makes the two models of information processing different (Scheufele, 2000).

An emotion dimension 
According to the theory of affective intelligence, "emotions enhance citizen rationality". It argues that emotions, particularly negative ones, are crucial in having people pay attention to politics and help shape their political views. Based on that, Renita Coleman and H. Denis Wu (2010) study whether the TV portrayals of candidates impacts people's political judgment during the 2004 U.S. presidential Election. They find that apart from the cognitive assessment, which is commonly studied before, emotion is another critical dimension of the second-level affects in agenda-setting. Three conclusions are presented:
 The media's emotional-affective agenda corresponds with the public's emotional impressions of candidates;
 Negative emotions are more powerful than positive emotions;
 Agenda-setting effects are greater on the audiences' emotions than on their cognitive assessments of character traits.

Agenda setting between media and other sources 
Recent research on agenda-setting digs into the question of "who sets the media agenda". In the broad field of political communication there is a current that draws on both political science and communication science, and is concerned with the extent to which and how the media contribute to the establishment of the political agenda. The original agenda-setting study by McCombs and Shaw found that the amount of media exposure given to a topic influences the public salience of that topic. Meaning, repeated exposure is what causes the public to deem, a topic as important. Politicians and political organizations fight for media time and space, following the theory that exposure increases important. Politicians put a lot of time and resources into campaigns, the 2010 Citizens United ruling held that the First Amendment prohibited the government from restricting spending on political speech. This means that politicians and their parties set their agenda through social media and traditional media campaigns. A study by Gilardi et al. researching the relationship between three agendas: the traditional media agenda, the social media agenda of candidates, and the social media agenda of politicians, found that they have significant influences among the several agendas.

Power relations between media and other sources 
Littlejohn and Foss (2011) suggest that there are four types of power relations between media and other sources:
 High-power source & high-power media: both are equals in setting the agenda
 High-power source & low-power media: the source sets the agenda for the media
 Low-power source & high-power media: the media set their own agenda and may marginalize the source
 Low-power source & low-power media: both are too weak to set the public agenda

Intermedia agenda setting 
News organizations affect one another's agendas. McCombs and Bell (1996) observe that journalists live in "an ambiguous social world" so that they will "rely on one another for confirmation and as a source of ideas". Lim (2011) finds that the major news websites in South Korea influence the agendas of online newspapers and also influence each other to some extent.

According to McCombs and Funk (2011), intermedia agenda setting is a new path of the future agenda setting research.

In addition to social media, popular daily publications such as The New York Times and The Washington Post are "agenda setters" within the United States Media. These publications have a direct effect on local newspapers and television networks that are viewed on a less elite scale.

Website networks favor other websites that tend to have a higher viewing and SEO. This type of relationship is known as Power Law which allows the media to have a stronger effect on agenda setting. "Furthermore, the "birds of a feather" argument suggests that because news now exists in a network of connected websites, elite and other types of news media are now more motivated to behave similarly."

Third-level agenda-setting: network agenda setting model 
The most recent agenda-setting studies explore "the extent to which the news media can transfer the salience of relationships among a set of elements to the public". That is, researchers assume that the media can not only influence the salience of certain topics in public agenda, but they can also influence how the public relate these topics to one another. Based on that, Guo, Vu and McCombs (2012) bring up a new theoretical model called Network Agenda Setting Model, which they refer to as the third-level agenda-setting. This model shows that "the news media can bundle sets of objects or attributes and make these bundles of elements salient in the public's mind simultaneously". In other words, elements in people's mind are not linear as traditional approaches indicate; instead, they are interconnected with each other to make a network-like structure in one's mind; and if the news media always mention two elements together, the audience will "perceive these two elements as interconnected".

Application of agenda-setting theory for the study of various topics

In USA

Twitter application
Over the last few years, the increase in social media use has had a direct effect on political campaign strategy, particularly on the Social Media platform Twitter. Its unique platform allows users to showcase their political opinion without functioning two directions. It is currently being viewed as a platform for political advancement. Before the use of Twitter, political candidates were using blogs and websites to portray their message and to gain more attention and popularity among their followers. Some of the most followed users on Twitter are past and current Presidents of the United States and other political figures. In terms of retweets, politicians and political parties have been labeled "influentials" on Twitter. Twitter is being used as a resource to gather information, reach a larger audience and engagement, stay up to date with current social and political issues, and to achieve the agenda building role. Twitter helps express public opinion which in turn allows a relationship to form between the media and the public. Some may argue that Twitter is still being used as a place for people to follow celebrity news and the culture of Hollywood more than it is being used for important issues and world news. Some may also argue that Twitter does not have the ability to set an agenda as much as conventional news outlets. A 2015 study found a positive correlation between issue ranks in news coverage and issue ranks in Twitter feeds, suggesting that Twitter and conventional news outlets by and large reflected each other. The influence of Twitter may not always seem direct and can change during different phases.

Non-political application
McCombs and Shaw originally established agenda-setting within the context of a presidential election. Many subsequent studies have looked at agenda setting in the context of an election or in otherwise political contexts. However, more recently scholars have been studying agenda setting in the context of brand community. A brand is defined as what resides in the minds of individuals about a product or service. Brand community is described as a "specialized, non-geographically bound community based on a structured set of social relations among admirers of a brand." Under these definitions more than just material products can qualify as a brand, political candidates or even celebrities could be viewed as a brand as well. The theory can also be applied to commercial advertising, business news and corporate reputation, business influence on federal policy, legal systems, trials, roles of social groups, audience control, public opinion, and public relations.
 Agenda-setting in business communication. The central theoretical idea of agenda-setting theory fits well in the world of business communication as well as political communication setting. "In the case of corporate reputations, only the operational definitions of the objects and attributes on these agendas are changed to frame five key theoretical propositions about the influence of news coverage on corporate reputations among the public. This presentation of five basic propositions offers a theoretical roadmap for systematic empirical research into the influence of the mass media on corporate reputations"
 Agenda-setting in business news coverage. Agenda-setting in news coverage for business has expanded to other forms of media to showcase the importance of media usage to businesses and consumers. Businesses are focusing on hiring more journalists and training them so they can perform better. In training the journalist, businesses can ensure that the reporters avoid bias and keep in mind the business' values. This is why when reading newspapers, certain articles influence people differently because editors are working behind the scenes to figure out the placement of articles and how long or short the stories will be. This showcases the importance agenda-setting has on newspapers since it gives the companies the ability to format stories they want their readers to read and therefore create a mindset that leans a certain way.
 Agenda-setting in mass media. Agenda-setting in mass media determines what viewers hear and see. This was founded out by journalist Walter Lippmann in the 1920s. He also found out that the media determines what pictures are formed in our minds therefore, refiguring the events to make it simpler for viewers to understand. After learning about this, researchers Maxwell McCombs and Donald Shaw took it a step further and wrote about it in their book Emergence of American Political Issues. The book focused on how workers in the press are always looking through the media to select what is written or aired for viewers. They are bringing to light that agenda-setting is in every medium people read and has been a part of our culture for a long time. Agenda-setting creates media that viewers want to see and hear at a given moment and is noticeable when related to politics.
 Agenda-setting in advertising. Ghorpade demonstrated media's agenda-setting can "go beyond the transfer of silence to the effect of intended behavior" and is thus relevant to advertising.
 Agenda-setting in interpersonal communication. Although agenda-setting theory is related to mass communication theory, it can be applied to interpersonal communication as well. Yang and Stone investigated people who prefer to interpersonal communication have the same agenda as others who rely on mass media. According to them, the public agenda suggested by media can flow through interpersonal communication as well.
 Agenda-setting in crime. Agenda-setting can be connected to cultivation theory. Lowry et al. conducted a longitudinal study and revealed that network television news covering crimes often made the public not only concentrate on criminal cases but also tremble with fear.
 Agenda-setting in health communication. 
 Ogata Jones, Denham and Springston (2006) studied the mass and interpersonal communication on breast cancer screening practice and found that mass media is essential in "setting an agenda for proactive health behaviors". Women who were directly or indirectly exposed to news articles about breast cancer tended to conduct more frequent screenings than those hadn't read such articles.
 The globe is worried about the reluctance to get vaccinated against the 2019 coronavirus illness (COVID-19). To solve this issue, both the public and commercial sectors are taking action. The media is essential for the widespread dissemination of information. The agenda-setting platform's influence on the public's perception of the COVID-19 immunization campaign is highlighted in Medina, Rodriguez and Sarmiento’s essay. Massive media dissemination of information can be a useful tool in educating the public about the value of anti-COVID 19 vaccines for both promoting individual well-being and the common good.
 Agenda-setting and stereotypes. Besova and Cooley (2010) found that the agenda-setting function of the media has a major effect on public opinion and how Americans perceive or judge a particular issue. They also found that negative media coverage, as opposed to neutral or positive, has greater agenda-setting power which can contribute to the formation and perpetuation of stereotypes. For example, the media often portrays foreign countries stereotypically by only covering certain stories concerned with certain issues. Only 5.6% of the international news produced by the United States media covers Africa which likely means viewers do not receive a well-rounded view of the entire continent.
 Agenda setting and non-profit organizations. Waters (2013) demonstrated the impact agenda-setting has on non-profit organizations when raising funds for a sudden cause. Specifically, using three natural disasters as an example; the 2004 Asian tsunami, 2005's Hurricane Katrina, and the 2010 Haitian earthquake. Fundraiser practitioners believe gaining media coverage on relief efforts increases donations, however, five of the top organizations (the American Red Cross, UNICEF, Catholic Relief Services, World Vision, and Doctors Without Borders), received majority of the donations provided by the United States public. A study was done to examine their efforts in relation to media coverage using agenda-setting theory, to test if those non-profit organizations increased their donations due to more news coverage of these three disasters. It was found that there was a strong, positive, relationship between the public's natural urgent response to these tragic events and the amount of media relations produced.

Study of topics outside US
Europe: Agenda-setting theory is applicable to other countries as well. In Europe, agenda-setting theory has been applied in similar pattern as in the United States. McCombs and Maxwell also investigated agenda-setting theory in the context of the 1995 regional and municipal elections in Spain. Maniou and Bantimaroudis (2018) examined the application of agenda-setting theory in the case of the Greek media during the left administration of A. Tsipras and introduced the term 'hybrid salience'.
China: 
Guoliang, Shao and Bowman examined that agenda-setting effect in China is not as strong as in the Western world. They provided empirical evidences in political and media structure in China.
According to Luo’s article, the author found that in modern China, internet public opinion has emerged as a rival agenda-setting power. In the context of China, this study looked at whether and how online public opinion affects the national issue agendas of the traditional media and the government. The statistics demonstrated that while the government may occasionally set the agenda for the online public, the online public did not have a significant influence on the government's agenda.
Japan: In an analysis of the policy making process concerning temporary labor migration to Japan, Kremers observed how migrant advocacy organizations influencing public opinion through agenda setting, priming and framing, had a limiting effect on the impact of other interest groups.
Saudi Arabia: Through the modification of the agenda-setting technique in response to the input of social media, Albalawi and Sixsmith’s study offers a fresh contribution to health promotion. This investigation and suggested modification are based on research that looked at how well Twitter affected users' agenda-setting in relation to traffic accidents in Saudi Arabia.

Future research topics (presently understudied) 

Since the Chapel Hill study, a great deal of research has been carried out to discover the agenda-setting influence of the news media. The theory has not been limited to elections, and many scholars constantly explored the agenda-setting effect in a variety of communication situations. This explains that agenda-setting has a theoretical value which is able to synthesize social phenomena and to build new research questions.

Another contribution of agenda-setting is to show the power of media. Since the study of 1940 presidential election in Erie County, Ohio, by Paul Lazarsfeld and his colleagues, little evidence of mass communication effects was found over the next twenty years. In 1960, Joseph Klapper's Effects of Mass Communication also declared the limited effect of media. Agenda-setting caused a paradigm shift in the study of media effects from persuading to informing by its connection of media content and its effects on the public.

Empowerment-of-masses and decentralizing impact of Internet 

The advent of the Internet and social networks give rise to a variety of opinions concerning agenda-setting effects online. Some have claimed that the power of traditional media has been weakened. Others think that the agenda-setting process and its role have continued on the Internet, specifically in electronic bulletin boards. With the presence of rapid mass communication, like social media, the agenda setting theory is both supported and challenged to evolve. Some suggest that social media and traditional media in political campaigns will integrate. Social media is the next step of agenda setting because now popular Twitter handles can now choose what they want their followers to see. While some theorize that the rise of social media will bring a downfall to journalists ability to set the agenda, there is considerable scholarship to counterbalance this form of thinking. People can also chose which accounts they want to follow on any social media platform. This has changed the way in which agenda setting is going and will continue to change throughout the evolution of technology and different media platforms.

One example that provides realistic criticism for this theory was the use of Twitter by reporters during the 2012 presidential election and the role that two way communication models now exist within the news media discourse.

Traditional media such as newspapers and broadcast television are "vertical media" in which authority, power and influence come from the "top" and flow "down" to the public. Nowadays vertical media is undergoing rapid decline with the growing of "horizontal media" – new media enables everyone to become a source of information and influence, which means the media is "distributed horizontally instead of top-down".

Agenda-melding 

Another change of Agenda-setting Theory is known as agenda-melding, which focuses "on the personal agendas of individuals vis-à-vis their community and group affiliations". This means that individuals join groups and blend their agendas with the agendas of the group. Then groups and communities represent a "collected agenda of issues" and "one joins a group by adopting an agenda". On the other hand, agenda setting defines groups as "collections of people based on some shared values, attitudes, or opinions" that individuals join. This is different from traditional agenda setting because according to Shaw et al. individuals join groups in order to avoid social dissonance and isolation that is also known as "need for orientation". Therefore, in the past in order to belong people would learn and adopt the agenda of the group. Now with the ease of access to media, people form their own agendas and then find groups that have similar agendas that they agree with.

The advances in technology have made agenda melding easy for people to develop because there is a wide range of groups and individual agendas. The Internet makes it possible for people all around the globe to find others with similar agendas and collaborate with them. In the past agenda setting was limited to general topics and it was geographically bound because travel was limited.

Agenda-cutting 
One under-researched concept in the context of agenda-setting theory is the concept of agenda-cutting. However, to which extent agenda-cutting relates to agenda-setting is subject to further inquiry. Colistra defines agenda-cutting as the attempt to direct attention away from relevant issues “(1) by placing an item low on the news agenda (burying it), (2) by removing it from agenda once it is there, or (3) by completely ignoring it by never placing it on the agenda in the first place”. Moreover, agenda-cutting is seen to occur to news issues that are significant and controversial. Agenda-cutting needs to be motivated by the deliberate intention to drop a news issue from the agenda; otherwise, a case of news omission does not qualify for agenda-cutting but rather constitutes a result of news selection (which tries to differentiate between the relevant and the irrelevant).

Despite being first mentioned in the 1980s by Mallory Wober and Barrie Gunter, agenda-cutting has only been sporadically taken up in scholarly research. One reason for the academic neglect of this concept is seen in the fact that there have been only few empirical investigations on the one hand, while no sufficient theoretical basis has been established on the other. First steps towards conceptualizing and operationalizing agenda-cutting have been put forward by Buchmeier.

To date, only a handful of empirical studies focusing on media content exists, among them studies from Germany, Egypt, Malaysia, the US, and Japan (in chronological order).

Other studies shed light on the editorial processes in the newsroom which potentially lead to agenda-cutting.

There are two non-profit media watchdog organizations whose mission is to draw attention to neglected and censored issues in the news: Project Censored in the US and INA (Initiative News Enlightenment) in Germany.

Social media
An increasing number of perspectives suggest that as social media becomes part and parcel of modern discourses, digital media platforms are instrumental in rebalancing agenda-setting power in favor of the Internet. Studies suggest that as of 2016, a significant segment of Americans claimed to have used social media to get news and current events. This development intersects with the reality that the agenda-setting environment is heavily influenced by political actors who leverage digital interconnectedness to share unfiltered ideas directly with the public. One particular experiment, carried out by Jessica Feezell, posits that individuals who are exposed to political information on Facebook show higher levels of issue salience consistent with the issues shared in comparison to those who are not shown political information.

Prior to the advent of social media, mainstream news outlets were often framed as the gatekeeper of news. While social media has lessened the gatekeeping power of traditional news, some studies indicate that when social media and traditional media are compared, there is no concrete evidence that one medium is more pervasive than the others. Gilardi et al. conducted a study in 2021 which found that when comparing three agendas – traditional media, social media agenda of political parties, and the social media agenda of politicians – no compelling evidence shows that one medium impacts the others. Furthermore, no agenda leads the others more than is led by them. The overarching theme of this perspective is that the rise of social media has not changed the reality that politicians must complement advertisements with advocacy style grassroots campaigning in the form of public appearances, rallies, and speeches .

Meanwhile, one of the earliest perspectives on social media agenda-setting connected the growing prominence of social media to political blogging. Meraz conducted a deep exploration of United States-based political blogs across the ideological spectrum to determine whether independent political bloggers undermine the influence of elitist traditional media outlets. The analysis of multiple left and right leaning independent political blogging sites showed that independent blog platforms are redistributing power between traditional media and citizen media. Yet one interesting finding is that to maintain agenda-setting power, mainstream news outlets have established their own blogs to counter the narratives of independent bloggers who have challenged the agenda-setting styles of elitist news.

See also

 Cognitive and research related concepts 
 Availability heuristic, "easily recallable example" bias
 Framing effect, cognitive bias created by how options have been phrased
 Hypodermic needle model, intended message directly received and accepted by intended recipient
 Intertrial priming, accumulated effect of one stimuli impacts response to subsequent stimuli
 Schema, cognitive though pattern which categorizes and links information 
 Cultivation theory, long-term effects of TV
 Political agenda 
 Overton window, range of policies politically acceptable to mainstream population 
 Policy by press release, influencing public policy by making press releases
 Military–industrial–media complex, corrupt nexus which manipulates
 Politico-media complex, corrupt nexus of policy builders and setters
 Spin, public relation propaganda e.g. political bullshit
 Media related topics
 Digital journalism
 Media bias
 News values, criteria for deciding which and how to report news
 Racial bias in criminal news
 Sensationalism
 Yellow journalism, profit-driven ethicsless eye-catching news reporting
 Generic topics
 Business communication
 Marketing
 Mass hysteria
 Sociology

References

Further reading
 
 
 Cohen, B. (1963). The Press and Foreign Policy. Princeton, NJ: Princeton University Press. 
 
 
 
 
 
 Iyengar, S., Kinder, D.R. (1986) More Than Meets the Eye: TV News, Priming, and Public Evaluations of the President. Public Communication and Behavior, Vol.1 New York: Academic.
 
 Kosicki, G. (2002). The media priming effect: news media and considerations affecting political judgements. In D. Pfau (Ed.), The persuasion handbook: Developments in theory and practice (p. 63-80). Thousand Oaks: Sage Publications.
 Kim, S., Scheufele, D.A., & Shanahan, J. (2002). Think about it this way: Attribute agenda-setting function of the press and the public's evaluation of a local issue. Journalism & Mass Communication Quarterly, 79, 7-25.
 
 Lippmann, W. (1922).  Public Opinion. New York: Macmillan.
 
 
 Revkin, A., Carter, S., Ellis,J., and McClean A. (2008, Nov.) On the Issues: Climate Change. The New York Times.
 Severin W., & Tankard, J. (2001). Communication Theories: Origins, Methods and Uses in Mass Communication (5th ed.). New York: Longman.
 
 
 
 
 Silber, Radomír. Partisan media and modern censorship: media influence on Czech political partisanship and the media's creation of limits to public opposition and control of exercising power in the Czech Republic in the 1990s. First edition. Brno: Tribun EU, 2017. 86 pages. Librix.eu. .

Mass media theories
News media
Framing (social sciences)
Management cybernetics